Antelm of Cluny was a Burgundian monk who became the first Latin Archbishop of Patras, and was one of the most important figures in the early Principality of Achaea in Greece. He was consecrated a bishop with Pope Innocent III acting as the principal consecrator on 29 April 1207 in Rome, Papal States.

References

Sources
 
 

12th-century births
1240s deaths
13th-century French clergy
Latin archbishops of Patras